Taghreed Najjar (Arabic:تغريد النجار)) is a Palestinian–Jordanian writer and publisher who was born on 28 September 1951 in Amman. She is the writer of over 50 Arabic children and young adults books. Some of her books were translated and published in different languages including English, Swedish, Turkish and French. She is the founder of Al Salwa Publishing House. Over the years, Al Najjar won several literary awards and in 2017 she was shortlisted for the Etisalat Children's Literature Award and the Sheikh Zayed Award. She is a member of the Jordanian Writer's Association.

Education and career 
Najjar is an author of children and young adult books who was born on 28 September 1951 in Jordan. In 1973, she graduated from the American University of Beirut with a bachelor's degree in English Language and a Diploma in Education with a minor in Psychology. Najjar worked as an English teacher and published her first children book "Safwan the Acrobat" in 1977. She has published more than 65 published books for children and young adults and she is considered a pioneer of modern literature of children in Jordan. Her book "Hawk Eye Mystery" was shortlisted in the Young Adult Book of the Year for Etisalat Award in 2014. At they same year, her story "Raghda's Hat" was shortlisted for Sheikh Zayed Book Award for Eighth Session. In 2019, Najjar was nominated for Astrid Lindgren Memorial Award. Her books were translated into different languages including Turkish, English, Swedish, French, and Chinese. Najjar participated in many international and regional conferences, events, and festivals like the Emirates Airline Festival of Literature in 2018.

Works

Children 
 Safwan the Acrobat (Original title: Safwan Al Bahlawan), 1977
 I Am Amazing (Original title: Ana Mudhisha), 1999
 I Can (Original title: Inani Astatee), 1999
 Not Yet (Original title: Laysa Baad), 1999
 My Brother Zaid (Original title: Akhi Zaid), 1999
 One Dark Night (Original title: Fi Layla Mothlema), 1999
 The Lie That Grew Bigger (Original title: Al Kethba Alati Kabarat), 2001
 Why Should I Sleep Early (Original title: Limatha Anamu Bakeran?), 2001
 The Nicest Day (Original title: Ahla Youm), 2004
 A Frog in our Classroom (Original title: Fi Safina Defda’a), 2004
 Don’t Worry Dad (Original title: La Taqlaq Ya Abi), 2004 
 First Day of School (Original title: Awal Youm Madrasa), 2005
 My Favorite Animal (Original title: Hayawani Al Mufadal), 2005
 When the Doorbell Rang (Original title: Endama Yaduqu Al Bab), 2006
 Adventure on the Farm (Original title: Mugamara Fi Al Mazra’a), 2008
 The Story about a Boy Named Fayez (Original title: Kisat Walad Esmuhu Fayez), 2008
 A Day on the Beach (Original title: Youmun Ala Shatee Al Bahr), 2009
 This is How Fish Swim (Original title: Hek Yesbahu Al Asmak), 2010
 Tasseh Tarantaseh, 2010
 A Home for Arnoub (Original title: Bait Al Arnab Al Saier), 2010
 Nashma and Jassem (Original title: Nashma wa Jassem), 2011
 Karma’s Rabbit (Original title: Arnabu Karma), 2011
 Anything (Original title: Ai Shaai), 2011
 Omar is Lost (Original title: Da’a Omar), 2012 
 Watch Out Jude (Original title: Intabihi Ya Jude), 2012
 Jude’s New Bicycle (Original title: Jude Wa Darajatuha Al Jadeeda), 2012 
 The Complete Halazone Series  (Original title: Selselat Al Halazona Al Khamela), 2012 
 Who Hid the Eid Lamb? (Original title: Man Khabaa Kharof Al Aid?), 2012
 Fifi , 2012 
 My Grandmother Nafeesa (Original title: Gadati Nafeesa), 2012
 Why not? (Original title: Ma Al Manai), 2013
 There’s a Jungle in Saifo’s Room (Original title: Fi Ghurfat Saifo Ghaba), 2014 
 Mr. Policeman (Original title: Amo Al Shurti), 2013 
 Kaak, 2013 
 Us Three Together (Original title: Ihna Al Thalatha Sawa), 2013
 Saadeh the Monkey, 2013 
 There’s a Jungle in Saifo’s Room (Original title: Fi Ghurfat Saifo Ghaba), 2014 
 Sky is Raining Food (Original title: Al Sama Tumtiru Ta’aman), 2015 
 Al Ghoul, 2015
 The Hard to Please Horse (Original title: Ashhab La Ya’ajebhu Al Ajab), 2016
 The Amazing Toilet Paper Roll (Original title: Lafafat Al Waraq Al Ajeeba), 2016
 What Happened to My Brother Ramez? (Original title: Matha Hasala Li Akhi Ramez), 2016
 Mrs. Jawaher and Her Cats (Original title: Al Sayeda Jawaher Sadeeqat Al Qitat), 2016
 Sleep Zaina  (Original title: Nami Ya Zina), 2016
 A Strange Adventure (Original title: Mughamara Ajeeba Ghareeba), 2017 
 Zekazam Zekazoom, 2018 
 The Amazing Egg Cartons 1 (Original title: Cartoonat Al Baid Al Ajeeba 1), 2019
 The Amazing Egg Cartons 2 (Original title: Cartoonat Al Baid Al Ajeeba 2), 2019 
 Tala’s Car (Original title: Saiarat Tala), 2019
 No Tala (Original title: La Ya Tala), 2019
 When Mama Got Sick (Original title: Mama Maredaa), 2019
 The Bird Flew (Original title: Wa Tar Al A’sfur), 2019
 Who’s First (Original title: Man Awalan?), 2019
 The Doctor’s Visit (Original title: Ziarat Tabeeb) 2019
 The Case of the Spotted Leopard (Original title: Sair Al Fahd Al Muraqqat), 2019

Teen 
 Raghda’s Hat (Original title: Kubaat Raghda), 2012
 Against the Tide (Original title: Set Al Kul), 2013
 The Mystery of the Falcon’s Eye (Original title: Lugz Ain Al Saqer), 2014
 One Day the Sun Will Shine (Original title: SaToshreq Al Shamsu WaLw Bada Heen), 2017
 Whose Doll is This? (Original title: Liman Hathihi Al Dumia), 2019

Awards 
She has been shortlisted and nominated for many awards including the Etisalat Award for Arabic Children's Literature, Sheikh Zayed Book Award, and Astrid Lindgren Memorial Award.

 Her collection of rhymes named "Musical Tickles" was selected by the National Center for Children's Literature as one of the best publications in the Arab World in 2012/2013.
 Her book "What Happened to My Brother Ramiz?" won the Etisalat Award for Arabic Children's Literature for Best Production.

See also 
 Eman Al Yousuf 
 Maria Dadouch
 Huda Hamad

References 

Palestinians in Jordan
1951 births
Living people
21st-century Palestinian women writers
21st-century Jordanian writers
21st-century Palestinian writers
Palestinian women children's writers
Jordanian women children's writers